Willy Dahl (born 26 March 1927) is a Norwegian literary researcher and literary critic. He was a professor at the University of Trondheim from 1978, and at the University of Bergen from 1981 to 1992. He has written several books on literary history. He has been a literary critic for the newspaper Arbeiderbladet.

Selected works

 (3 volumes)

References

1927 births
Living people
Academic staff of the Norwegian University of Science and Technology
Academic staff of the University of Bergen
Norwegian literary historians
Norwegian literary critics